Nicolás Ignacio Vigneri Cetrulo (born 6 July 1983) is a Uruguayan football manager and former player who played as either a winger or a striker. He is the current manager of Plaza Colonia.

Playing career
Vigneri began in 2003 at age 18 in Fénix of Uruguay, where he participated in the 6–1 vs Cruz Azul of Mexico for Copa Libertadores.

In 2006 he went to Peñarol, one of the biggest teams in the country. In 2008, he joined Cruz Azul on loan. He made his Interliga debut against San Luis in a 1–0 victory. Vigneri scored his first goal in the third match of his team in the 2008 Interliga against Pumas. He scored his second goal in the final of the Torneo Clausura 2008 against Santos Laguna.

In 2009, he joined Argentine club Racing Club. Later the same year, he was transferred to Puebla of Mexico, where he scored 4 goals and reached the final stages of the tournament. in 2010 he joined Spanish club Xerez in Primera División de España on loan.

Later the same year he returned to former club Fénix, before moving in January 2011 to Nacional, winning the championship.

On July 21, 2011 he was announced by Ecuadorian side Emelec's official website as its new striker on a loan with an option to buy, scoring 8 goals and good performances to reach the final.

In 2013 returned to Fénix for a third spell, scoring 4 goals in the tournament.

Later that year he returned to Ecuador to join Deportivo Quevedo of Ecuadorian Serie A. In January 2014 he was hired by Los Caimanes of Peruvian Primera División.

In July 2020, Vigneri moved to Uruguayan amateur club Uruguay Montevideo. He retired in the following year, aged 38.

Managerial career
Immediately after retiring, Vigneri became the manager of his last club Uruguay Montevideo. He left the club in November 2022, and took over Plaza Colonia the following 5 January, after Alejandro Apud's resignation.

Honours
Cruz Azul
Clausura runner-up: 2008

Emelec
Ecuadorian Serie A runner-up: 2011

Nacional
Uruguayan League: 2010–11

References

External links
 
  Profile at Argentine Primera Statistics
 
 Profile at Guardian statistics
  Profile at Emelec Player

1983 births
Living people
Footballers from Montevideo
Association football wingers
Association football forwards
Uruguayan footballers
Uruguay international footballers
Uruguayan expatriate footballers
Uruguayan Primera División players
Argentine Primera División players
Liga MX players
Ecuadorian Serie A players
Peruvian Primera División players
Uruguayan Segunda División players
Ascenso MX players
Liga FPD players
Centro Atlético Fénix players
Peñarol players
Cruz Azul footballers
Racing Club de Avellaneda footballers
Club Puebla players
Xerez CD footballers
Club Nacional de Football players
C.S. Emelec footballers
C.D. Quevedo footballers
Los Caimanes footballers
Rampla Juniors players
Huracán F.C. players
C.S. Cartaginés players
Murciélagos FC footballers
Villa Teresa players
Uruguay Montevideo players
Uruguayan expatriate sportspeople in Mexico
Uruguayan expatriate sportspeople in Argentina
Uruguayan expatriate sportspeople in Spain
Uruguayan expatriate sportspeople in Ecuador
Uruguayan expatriate sportspeople in Peru
Uruguayan expatriate sportspeople in Costa Rica
Expatriate footballers in Mexico
Expatriate footballers in Argentina
Expatriate footballers in Spain
Expatriate footballers in Ecuador
Expatriate footballers in Peru
Expatriate footballers in Costa Rica
Uruguayan football managers
Club Plaza Colonia de Deportes managers